Coronado School of the Arts (CoSA) is a school-within-a-school located on the campus of Coronado High School in Coronado, California. The school currently enrolls 155 students, of which nearly 70% comes from outside Coronado.

CoSA is largely an after-hours program with a focus on the arts,  in which students take academic courses at Coronado High School in the morning. The school offers classes in classical and contemporary dance, musical theater and drama, instrumental music, technical theater, visual art, and digital media and filmmaking. It has Ph.D.s on its faculty and what the San Diego Union Tribune calls "a formidable fund-raising auxiliary", the CoSA Foundation.

History 

The idea for the school materialized in 1993. The school was founded in 1996 by Kris McClung and had 60 students when it opened it doors in 1996.  In 2007, CoSA unveiled a $12 million theater arts complex that includes a 650-seat main-stage theater, a black-box theater, scene shop, music and drama rooms, administrative offices, and a fly loft.

In 2005, four evacuees of Hurricane Katrina relocated from the wind and rain damaged New Orleans Center for Creative Arts.

CoSA Departments 

 Musical Theater and Drama
 Technical Theater
 New Media (Digital Arts/Film)
 Music
 Dance
 Visual Arts

Performances 
CoSA generally puts on two musicals and one play every school years with many dance, instrumental music, art, and digital media shows/exhibits in between.

CoSA Foundation 
The Coronado School of the Arts Foundation provides the oversight and fundraising apparatus  for CoSA.  Private funding, in the form of donations, covers about half of CoSA's operating budget.  The remaining money is provided by the Coronado Unified School District, and through special state and federal grants.

In August 2008, Pamela Coker was appointed Executive Director for the CoSA Foundation.

References

External links 
 Coronado School of the Arts Website

High schools in San Diego County, California
Coronado, California
Art schools in California
Schools of the performing arts in the United States
Alternative schools in California
Public high schools in California
1996 establishments in California